Camillo Borghese may refer to:

Pope Paul V (1550–1621), born Camillo Borghese
Camillo Borghese, 6th Prince of Sulmona (1775–1832)
Camillo Borghese (archbishop) (died 1612), Italian Roman Catholic archbishop